Philip Martin (born 27 October 1947) is an Irish pianist, composer, and piano pedagogue.

References

External links

Biography, Contemporary Music Centre, Ireland

1947 births
20th-century classical composers
21st-century classical composers
21st-century classical pianists
Aosdána members
Composers for piano
Fellows of the Royal Academy of Music
Irish classical composers
Place of birth missing (living people)
Irish classical pianists
Irish emigrants to the United Kingdom
Irish songwriters
Living people
Musicians from Dublin (city)